The North Borders is the fifth studio album by British musician Bonobo. It was due for release on 1 April 2013, but was released early on 21 March in digital format after a promotional copy was leaked. The album charted at number 29 on the UK Albums Chart. As of 20 January 2017 it had sold 56,993 copies in UK.

Packaging
The artwork for North Borders and its singles were created by Australian art director and album artist Leif Podhajsky.

Track listing

Charts

Trivia
 The track "Ten Tigers" is probably named after the Ten Tigers of Canton.
 The track "Cirrus" was featured as the closing song of the pilot episode for the AMC show Halt and Catch Fire.

Certifications

References

External links
 Bonobo - The North Borders, review by BBC
 The North Borders by Bonobo, review by Ninja Tune
 

2013 albums
Bonobo (musician) albums
Ninja Tune albums